Edward Brice Killen Gordon (4 November 1885 – 6 September 1964) was a New Zealand politician of the National Party.

Biography

Gordon was born in Marton in 1885. He received his education at Marton District High School and at Prince Albert College in Auckland's Queen Street. He worked on a farm near Taihape, and then in the bush north of Wanganui.

In 1917, he married Mary Alexandra Grant before enlisting for World War I; at the time, they were living in Palmerston North. After the war, he purchased a farm near Mangaweka, but moved back to Marton to take over a farm there. He was involved with various farming organisations and chaired the Marton branch of the Farmers' Union, was vice-president of the Marton A&P Association, and a member of the Rangitikei Rabbit Board.

With the formation of the National Party in 1936, he became the electorate chairman for Rangitikei. Boundary changes had resulted in the loss of the urban part of Wanganui from the electorate, which was now fully rural. Although Labour obtained a landslide victory in the election, Wilson lost against Gordon of the National Party by 300 votes.

He died in 1964.

Notes

References

1885 births
1964 deaths
New Zealand National Party MPs
New Zealand MPs for North Island electorates
Members of the New Zealand House of Representatives
New Zealand military personnel of World War I
People educated at Prince Albert College
People educated at Rangitikei College

de:Edward Gordon
fr:Ed Gordon
ja:エド・ゴードン
no:Ed Gordon
pl:Ed Gordon
fi:Ed Gordon
sv:Ed Gordon